Montebuono is a  (municipality) in the Province of Rieti in the Italian region of Latium, located about  north of Rome and about  west of Rieti.

Montebuono borders the following municipalities: Calvi dell'Umbria, Collevecchio, Magliano Sabina, Tarano, Torri in Sabina.

References

External links
 Official website

Cities and towns in Lazio